"I'm Just Here for the Music" is a song by American singer Paula Abdul. The single followed Abdul's 2008 comeback "Dance Like There's No Tomorrow", and was released on May 8, 2009 by Filament Entertainment Group, a label distributed by Caroline Distribution. The track was produced by Oliver Leiber, who produced Abdul’s debut album Forever Your Girl.

Background and release
The song was written by Danielle Brisebois, Wayne Rodrigues and produced by Oliver Leiber, who had a role producing Abdul's debut album Forever Your Girl. Abdul debuted the song on the Ryan Seacrest Radio KIIS-FM show. The song uses an autotuner and electronic synthesizers over an uptempo electronic beat. The song was originally an unreleased song cut from Kylie Minogue's ninth album Body Language (2003). This is not the first time that Minogue and Abdul have exchanged tracks. In 2000, Minogue added the Abdul penned single "Spinning Around" to her 2000 album Light Years.

Live performance
In May 2009, Abdul performed the song on American Idol.

Charts

References

Paula Abdul songs
2009 singles
Kylie Minogue songs
Songs written by Danielle Brisebois
2009 songs
Caroline Records singles